Joey Calistri (born November 20, 1993) is an American former professional soccer player.

Career

Youth College
Calistri initially learned his skills at Deerfield High School in Deerfield, Illinois.

Calistri was a member of the Chicago Fire Academy for three seasons before spending his college career at Northwestern University.

Calistri also played in the Premier Development League for Chicago Fire U-23.

Professional
On December 17, 2015, Calistri signed a homegrown contract with the Chicago Fire.

He made his professional debut on March 6, 2016 as an 81st-minute substitute during a 3–4 defeat to New York City FC.

Calistri signed with USL side Saint Louis FC on January 17, 2018.

On December 20, 2018, Calistri joined USL Championship side Phoenix Rising ahead of the 2019 season.

References

External links
 
 
 Northwestern Wildcats bio
 

1993 births
Living people
American soccer players
Association football forwards
Chicago Fire FC players
Chicago Fire U-23 players
Homegrown Players (MLS)
Major League Soccer players
Northwestern Wildcats men's soccer players
People from Deerfield, Illinois
Phoenix Rising FC players
Saint Louis FC players
Soccer players from Illinois
Sportspeople from Cook County, Illinois
FC Tulsa players
USL League Two players
USL Championship players